Visitors to Liberia must obtain a visa from one of the Liberian diplomatic missions unless they come from one of the visa exempt countries. Yellow fever vaccination is required.

Visa policy map

Visa exemption 
Citizens of the following 14 countries can visit Liberia without a visa:

Visa is also not required by citizens of China, South Africa and Vietnam holding diplomatic or service passports and citizens of Kuwait, Turkey holding diplomatic passports.

Visa on arrival 
Passport holders of  may obtain a visa on arrival to Liberia, but are required to submit their applications via e-mail prior to arrival.

The VoA facility to visitors who may not be able to obtain visa at the Liberia's Missions or Embassies in countries of residence due to the absence of a Liberian mission or there is an urgency in meeting a business or work obligation in Liberia.
Also a visa may be issued if necessary to travellers starting their journey from a country that has no diplomatic representation of Liberia on condition that the transporting carrier sends a telex message the station manager in Monrovia. If the confirmation is received from the station manager and the copy of the telex confirmation is attached to the ticket, a traveller may board.

A broader visa on arrival for tourists was announced in January 2019.

eVisa
Liberia plans to introduce eVisas from 2019.

See also

Visa requirements for Liberian citizens

References

Liberia
Foreign relations of Liberia